Flordelis dos Santos de Souza (born 5 February 1961), known as Flordelis, is a Brazilian Contemporary Christian singer, Pentecostal pastor, former member of the Chamber of Deputies (representing Rio de Janeiro), and criminal convicted of the murder of her husband, pastor Anderson do Carmo. She belonged to the party Brazilian Democratic Movement (MDB) between 2004 and 2018, and was a member of Social Democratic Party (PSD) between 2018 and 2021.

She has 3 biological and 51 “adopted” children, though it is unclear how many of these were legally adopted. She adopted Anderson do Carmo at the age of 14 in 1991, and married him in 1998. In 1999, they co-founded the church Comunidade Evangélica Ministério Flordelis. In November 2022, she was convicted of murder of Anderson and sentenced to 50 years in prison.

Biography
Flordelis was born in Jacarezinho, Rio de Janeiro in 1961 to Francisco dos Santos and Carmozina Motta dos Santos. At the age of 14, she lost her father and brother in a car accident. She became a teacher and pastor, and in 1994, she adopted 37 children at once. Her charity work and adoptions attracted the attention of the media, and a film based on her life, Flordelis: Basta uma Palavra para Mudar, was released in 2009. After the release of the film, Flordelis approached the Rio de Janeiro label MK Music. Until then, she had released independent records and one distributed by Apascentar Music, a label of the then-band Toque no Altar. In 2010 she signed with MK Music and released her first album, Fogo e Unção.

Political career
In 2004, Flordelis ran unsuccessfully for the São Gonçalo City Council. In 2016, she ran for mayor of São Gonçalo for the MDB. From 2019 until 2021, Flordelis was a member of the Chamber of Deputies representing Rio de Janeiro after winning the 2018 elections, after having received support from Arolde de Oliveira.

Murder charges
Early in the morning of 16 June 2019, her husband, Anderson do Carmo de Souza, was shot dead outside his home. One of the adopted children, 18-year-old Lucas dos Santos do Carmo, pleaded guilty to the murder, and also accused one of his adoptive brothers, the 38-year-old Flávio dos Santos, of complicity. In August 2020, prosecutors announced charges against Flordelis and several of her children, alleging that they had orchestrated Anderson's murder. Police could not arrest Flordelis because she held parliamentary immunity, but detectives pushed for her status as a member of Congress to be stripped.

Loss of mandate
In June 2021, the Ethics Council of Brazil approved the loss of the mandate of Representative Flordelis, by 16 votes to 1. The Chamber floor approved the resolution with 437 votes for the removal, 7 against and 12 abstentions. On August 11, 2021, Flordelis had her mandate as a Congresswoman revoked by the Chamber, in a lawsuit filed by Representative Alexandre Leite. She lost her term of office for breach of parliamentary decorum and, as a result, could be tried and imprisoned for her husband's death. In addition to losing office, a Representative will be ineligible as determined by the Law of Ficha Limpa.

See also
 List of scandals in Brazil

Conviction and prison
Flordelis had her preventive detention decreed by the 3rd Criminal Court of Niterói after being arrested on August 13, 2021 by Rio de Janeiro Civil Police. She lost the parliamentary immunity she enjoyed when her term was revoked, and is thus subject to the same treatment as an ordinary citizen. In November 2022, she was convicted of murder and sentenced to 50 years in prison.

Discography

Studio albums
 Multidão (1998)
 Só o Amor (2002)
 A Voz do Silêncio (2005)
 Não  se  Entregue (2008)
 Fogo e Unção (2010)
 Questiona ou Adora (2012)
 A Volta por Cima (2014)
 Realize (2017)
 O Sonho Não Morreu (2018)

Live albums
 Ao Vivo (2016)

Video albums
Ao Vivo (2016)

References

1961 births
Living people
Politicians from Rio de Janeiro (city)
21st-century Brazilian women politicians
Brazilian mezzo-sopranos
Brazilian gospel singers
Brazilian Democratic Movement politicians
Social Democratic Party (Brazil, 2011) politicians
Members of the Chamber of Deputies (Brazil) from Rio de Janeiro (state)
Performers of contemporary Christian music
Brazilian performers of Christian music
Political scandals in Brazil
Brazilian Christian religious leaders
20th-century Brazilian women singers
20th-century Brazilian singers
21st-century Brazilian women singers
21st-century Brazilian singers